Armenian passport is a passport issued to Armenian citizens to enable them to travel outside Armenia, and entitles the bearer to the protection of Armenia's consular officials overseas. Armenian citizens have visa-free or visa on arrival access to 65 countries and territories as of 2022.

Between the years 1994 and 2005, all Soviet Union passports were completely replaced with Armenian passports, invalidating Soviet Union passports' use in Armenia since 2005. Today, Armenian passports are also used as proof of identity within the country, along with Armenian ID cards.

Physical appearance
An ordinary Armenian passport is dark blue, with the Armenian coat of arms emblazoned in gold in the center of the front cover. The words  "Republic of Armenia" and  "Passport" in Armenian and English languages also appear on the front cover. The passport is valid for 10 years from the time of issue, with the further possibility of extending validity for an additional 5 years. The possibility of extending the passport by 5 years was eliminated in August 2017. It contains 32 pages for special notes and visas, and information about its holder in both the Armenian and English languages.

Since 1 June 2012, two new ID-documents were introduced, which replaced the ordinary passports of Armenian citizens. One of the documents – the ID card — to be used locally within the country, and the second document – the biometric passport — to be used for traveling abroad. An electronic chip on the passport will contain digital images of fingerprints and photo of passport holder. Both biometric passports and eID cards are produced by Polish Security Printing Works (Polska Wytwornia Papierow Wartosciowych). Old style (non-biometric) passports were re-introduced in 2016 on a temporary basis (until January 1, 2019), and currently Armenian citizens can acquire both biometric and regular passports.

Identity information page

Armenian Passport includes the following data:

 Անձնագրի սեփականատիրոջ լուսանկարը / Photo of Passport Holder
 Տեսակը (P) / Type (P)
 Երկրի կոդը (ARM) / Country Code (ARM)
 Անձնագրի համարը / Passport No.
 Ազգանունը / Surname (1)
 Անունը/անունները / Given Names (2)
 Ազգությունը / Nationality (3)
 Ծննդյան ամսաթիվը / Date of Birth (4)
 Սեռը / Sex (5)
 Ծննդավայրը / Country of Birth (6)
 ամսաթիվը թողարկման / Date of Issue (7)
 Ամսաթվի թողարկումը / Date of Expiry (8)
 Կատարող մարմնի կոդը / Issuing Authority code (9)

Limitations on passport use

As a result of the first Nagorno-Karabakh War between Artsakh, Armenia and Azerbaijan, Azerbaijan refuses entry to holders of Armenian passports, as well as passport-holders of any other country if they are of Armenian descent. It also strictly refuses entry to foreigners in general whose passport shows evidence of entry into the Republic of Artsakh, immediately declaring them permanent personae non gratae.

Gallery

Visa requirements

 In 2020, Armenian citizens had visa-free or visa on arrival access to 65 countries and territories, ranking the Armenian passport 78th in the world according to the Henley & Partners Passport Index.
 As of 2020, holders of an Armenian passport may enter all Commonwealth of Independent States and Eurasian Union member states without a visa.
 The Head of the EU Delegation to Armenia, Ambassador Piotr Switalski stated that, the action plan for beginning visa liberalization between Armenia and the EU will be on the agenda of the next Eastern Partnership summit in 2017 and dialogue for visa-free travel of Armenian citizens to the EU's Schengen Area will begin in early 2018. The Ambassador also stated that Armenian citizens could be granted visa-free travel to the EU by 2020.
 As of 1 January 2013, Armenia dropped the requirement of entry visas for citizens of all 27 EU member states as well as the 4 members of the European Free Trade Association (Iceland, Liechtenstein, Norway and Switzerland). By approving the unilateral abolition of visas for EU and EFTA citizens, Armenia seeks to accelerate negotiations with the EU on visa-free travel for Armenian citizens travelling to the Schengen Area in return. According to the planned agreement with the EU, the current procedure for obtaining Schengen visas for citizens of Armenia would be relaxed, until visa-free travel is finalized. The new simplified procedure is provided for members of official delegations, researchers and students, journalists, those in sports or the arts, and for close relatives of citizens legally residing in the EU. It is also intended to reduce visa costs by 35 euros or free for these categories, as well as for children and pensioners. For more info see: E-visa system.

See also
 Artsakh passport
 Foreign relations of Armenia
 List of citizenships refused entry to foreign states
 List of passports
 Visa policy of Armenia
 Visa requirements for Armenian citizens

References

Armenia
Government of Armenia